Howmore lies on the island of South Uist to the southwest of Loch Druidibeg. Howmore is also within the parish of South Uist.

Geography
The area is largely flat but dominated by the mountain Beinn Mhòr. A rewarding day's hillwalking can be had on Beinn Mhor and Hecla [] - South Uist's highest hills. Loch Druidibeg Nature Reserve,  to the north, is an important site for breeding greylag geese and a sanctuary for the corncrake, now, within Britain, almost unique to the Western Isles. Howmore is situated alongside the A865.

On the southern slopes of Beinn Mhor is the wooded area of Allt Volagir, one of the few areas of natural woodland left in the Hebrides.

History
 The village is perhaps best known for its remarkable collection of ruined churches and chapels. The most striking remains are of the Teampull Mor, the "Large Church" or St Mary's, of which only part of the east gable remains. This church probably dates back to the 13th century and it was used as the parish church.

The islands were all wooded once until the arrival of the Vikings who are traditionally blamed for clearing the trees (though this fact is disputed).

Community

Church
At the time of the Reformation, Howmore turned to Protestantism, though 95% of the population of South Uist remained Roman Catholic. Howmore Church, built in 1858, is therefore rather unusual; doubly so as it is one of the few churches in Scotland with a central Communion table. The church is white-harled and used as a landmark by fishermen off the west coast.

Leisure
Howmore is home to one of Scotland's largest collections of thatched buildings. The youth hostel is operated by Gatliff Hebridean Hostels Trust. It is located in a white-painted thatched building which has views to the east across ruined churches towards the peak of Hecla.

Images

References

External links

Canmore - South Uist, Howmore, Old Churches and Chapels site record
Canmore - South Uist, Howmore site record

Villages on South Uist